Pyrobotrys elegans is a species of green algae in the family Spondylomoraceae.

References 

 Die Spondylomoraceen-Gattung Chlamydobotrys. J Behlau, 1935

External links 
  Pyrobotrys elegans at AlgaeBase

Chlamydomonadales